Daniel Lupi is an English film producer. He collaborated with Paul Thomas Anderson on each of his films.

Filmography
He was producer for all films unless otherwise noted.

Film

Production manager

Miscellaneous crew

Second unit director or assistant director

Thanks

Television

Production manager

References

External links

Living people
British film producers
1961 births
Unit production managers